Coronation Island is the largest of the South Orkney Islands,  long and from  wide.

History
The island was discovered in December 1821, in the course of the joint cruise by Captain Nathaniel Palmer, an American sealer, and Captain George Powell, a British sealer. Powell named the island in honour of the coronation of George IV, who had become king of the United Kingdom in 1820.

Antarctic Specially Protected Area
An area of some 92 km2 of north-central Coronation Island has been designated an Antarctic Specially Protected Area (ASPA 114), mainly for use as a relatively pristine reference site for use in comparative studies with more heavily impacted sites. It extends northwards from Brisbane Heights and Wave Peak in the central mountains to the coast between Conception Point in the west to Foul Point in the east. Most of the land in the site is covered by glacial ice, with small areas of ice-free terrain along the coast. Birds known to breed within the site include chinstrap penguins, Cape petrels and snow petrels.

Major features 
Many geographic features on and around Coronation Island have been charted and named by various exploration and survey groups.

The island's northwest point is called Penguin Point. Several named rock formations are located offshore just west of Penguin Point, including the Melsom Rocks, the Despair Rocks, and Lay-brother Rock.

Bays 
The island's irregular coast is indented by a great number of bays.

 Iceberg Bay indents the south coast between Cape Hansen and Olivine Point.
 Ommanney Bay indents the north coast between Prong Point and Foul Point.
 Sandefjord Bay indents the west coast near Monroe Island.

Other features 
 Cockscomb Buttress
 Endurance Ridge 
 Norway Bight
 Parpen Crags
 Purdy Point
 Rime Crests

See also 
 List of Antarctic and subantarctic islands
 Tønsberg Cove

References

 
Islands of the South Orkney Islands
Antarctic Specially Protected Areas